Moore v. Texas may refer to:

 Moore v. Texas (2017), a U.S. Supreme Court opinion on capital punishment regarding death row inmates with mental disabilities
 Moore v. Texas (2019), a U.S. Supreme Court opinion on capital punishment regarding death row inmates with mental disabilities